Lesignano is a small village (curazia) of San Marino. It belongs to the municipality of Serravalle (San Marino).

See also
Serravalle
Cà Ragni
Cinque Vie
Dogana
Falciano
Ponte Mellini
Rovereta
Valgiurata

Curazie in San Marino
Serravalle (San Marino)